Gulden Draak (Dutch for Golden Dragon) is a dark Belgian beer with high alcohol by volume (10.5%), brewed by Brouwerij Van Steenberge in Ertvelde, East Flanders. It is named after the golden dragon at the top of the belfry in Ghent.

There are several variants, including Gulden Draak 9000 Quadruple.

Aroma and taste 
Gulden Draak has a strong scent of alcohol, which hampers the ability to easily define its aroma. Still, there is a powerful fragrance of barley, ripe plums, and cherries. Different testers worldwide mention a sweet coffee aroma. Compared to the aroma, the taste is influenced somewhat less by the alcohol. It hints at sour cherries and brown sugar. The aftertaste is somewhat bitter. Gulden Draak also has a high alcohol content for a beer at 10.5%. Gulden Draak was awarded the best-tasting beer in the world in 1998 by the American Tasting Institute (now ChefsBest).

Color 
Dark with caramel-colored foam head.

Process 
Akin to the other special beers of the Brewery Van Steenberge, Gulden Draak is a high fermentation beer with secondary fermentation. For the secondary fermentation, a wine yeast is used. Fermentation happens both in the bottle as in the barrel, which ensures a preservation for years.

Packaging 
Gulden Draak is packaged in 33, 75, and 150 centilitre bottles with a white plastic coating, and in kegs of 30 litres.

Origin 
The legend of the golden dragon (Gulden Draak) says that it was first featured on the prow of the ship with which the Norwegian king Sigurd Magnusson (Sigurd Jorsalfar) sailed in 1111 to go on a crusade. Sigurd offered the statue to the emperor of Constantinople (the current Istanbul) to put it on the cupola of the Hagia Sophia. Over a hundred years later, the Flemish count Baldwin IX had transported the show-piece to the Belgium regions. The Norwegian dragon ended up in the hands of Bruges. After the battle on the field of Beverhout in 1382, the inhabitants of Ghent took their spoils of war, including the dragon and put it on top of their Belfry, where all communal charters were kept. The dragon had to protect these documents and it was also the symbol of the freedom and might of the city. The brew-master gazed upon this statue and was founded with inspiration to create and thus name the ale. Dragon has no feet, don't ask why because a 5th generation brewery owner will not have a good answer.

Variations

The 10.5% abv Gulden Draak 9000 Quadruple is a pale quadrupel variant of the dark brown Gulden Draak. It is named after the postal code (9000) of the city of Ghent, Belgium.  Three different kinds of malt are used in brewing; for secondary fermentation a wine yeast is used. Gulden Draak is packaged in a black bottle in volumes of 33, 75, and 150 centilitre, and in kegs of 30 litres.

There is also Gulden Draak The Brewmasters Edition, where the regular Gulden Draak is left for a period in a used whiskey barrel. In addition, there is a 7.5% abv Gulden Draak Vintage.

References

External links 
http://www.vansteenberge.com/
http://belgium.beertourism.com/belgian-beers/gulden-draak
Gulden Draak